Parliamentary elections were held in Egypt on 29 November 1995, with a second round for 168 seats on 6 December. The result was a victory for the ruling National Democratic Party (NDP), which won 318 seats. Following the election, 99 of the 112 independents also joined the NDP. Voter turnout was reported to be 47.99%.

Results

References

Egypt
1995 in Egypt
Election and referendum articles with incomplete results
Elections in Egypt
November 1995 events in Africa
December 1995 events in Africa